Ramana Lagemann is an American rally car driver, who started his professional career 
driving for Subaru of America in 2002. He remained a Subaru factory driver through 2004. He has competed at the X Games Rally in 2006 and 2007, and has multiple wins in SCCA Group N and Open class.

References

External links

Living people
American rally drivers
Year of birth missing (living people)

American racing drivers